Argyle is a station on the Chicago Transit Authority's 'L' system. It is situated between the Berwyn and Lawrence stations on the Red Line, which runs from Rogers Park at Chicago's northern city limits, through downtown Chicago, to Roseland. It is an elevated station with an island platform serving northbound trains and a temporary side platform serving southbound trains located at 1118 West Argyle Street in the West Argyle Street Historic District of Chicago's Uptown community area. Purple Line weekday rush hour express service use the outside tracks but do not stop at this station.

Location
Argyle is situated on West Argyle Street, close to the intersection with Broadway. The station is located in the West Argyle Street Historic District in the Uptown community area of Chicago; the area surrounding the station consists of a mixture commercial and residential areas, and is particularly noted for the high concentration of Vietnamese restaurants, bakeries and shops; as well as Chinese, Cambodian, Laotian, and Thai businesses.

History

The site of Argyle station was first used as Argyle Park on the Chicago and Evanston branch of the Chicago, Milwaukee & St. Paul Railroad route, which opened on May 21, 1885. On opening, the station houses along the route were described as "attractive frame structures built in the Gothic and Queen Anne styles." In 1908, the Northwestern Elevated Railroad was extended north from Wilson, using the tracks of the Chicago, Milwaukee & St. Paul Railroad, and a new station was constructed on the site of the previous depot. The station was again rebuilt to a design by architect Charles P. Rawson when the tracks between Wilson and Howard were elevated onto an embankment between 1914 and 1922. In 1979, the station received a $250,000 facelift and, in 1991, a Chinese-style hipped-and-gabled roof was added to the platform canopy. The station was closed for renovation from August 24 to October 5, 2012.

Services

Argyle is part of CTA's Red Line, which runs from the northern city limits at Howard Street to downtown Chicago and 95th street. The station has an island platform on an embankment located between Broadway and Winthrop Avenue. It serves the Red Line's two tracks; the northbound track serves trains to Howard, while the southbound track serves trains to 95th. The station entrance is located on the north side of Argyle Street, built into the embankment. It is located between the Berwyn and Lawrence stations. Red Line trains serve Argyle 24 hours a day, every day of the year; trains operate roughly every 3 to 9 minutes during rush hour and midday operation, with longer headways of up to 15 minutes at night.  The station is also located  a block from the 36 Broadway bus.

Red & Purple Modernization Project
The Argyle station is being rebuilt as part of this project. The station will receive new wider platforms, new signage, new lights, new security cameras, and new elevators, reconstruction will begin in May 2021 and will be completed by December 2024. During Stage A, the two northbound tracks and the main entrance will be closed with northbound trains using what is normally the southbound Red line tracks and southbound trains using the southbound Purple Line Express track stopping at a temporary side platform. Purple Line Express trains will continue to skip this station in both directions. Unlike a similar reconstruction happening simultaneously at Bryn Mawr, both platforms are using a single temporary entrance, as opposed to one platform using the normal entrance and one platform using a temporary entrance with no link in the paid area. Once Stage A is completed in 2022, Stage B will begin, where Argyle will temporarily close and be replaced by a temporary station at Foster Avenue.

Notes and references

Notes

References

External links 

Argyle Station Page CTA official site
Argyle Street entrance from Google Maps Street View

CTA Red Line stations
Railway stations in the United States opened in 1908
1908 establishments in Illinois